WTGG (96.5 FM is a radio station airing an Oldies format, licensed to Amite, Louisiana. The station serves the Hammond, Louisiana, area.

On September 21, 2011, Charles W. Dowdy, acting as the sole owner of license holder Southwest Broadcasting, Inc., dissolved the corporation and assigned the broadcast licenses it held (WTGG plus sister stations WAKH, WAKK, WAPF, WAZA, WFCG, WJSH, and WKJN) to himself acting as debtor in possession before initiating a Chapter 11 bankruptcy. The FCC approved the license transfer on December 19, 2011.

On October 25, 2019, the stations emerged and this signal was transferred to North Shore Broadcasting.

References

External links
 WTGG's official website

Hammond, Louisiana
Oldies radio stations in the United States
Radio stations in Louisiana